Cesareo or Cesáreo is a given name. Notable people with the given name include:

Cesáreo Bernaldo de Quirós (1879–1968), Argentine painter
Cesáreo Gabaráin (1936–1991), Spanish priest and composer
Cesareo Guillermo (1847–1885), Dominican politician
Cesáreo Onzari (1903–1964), Argentine footballer
Cesáreo Quezadas (born 1950), Mexican actor
Cesáreo Victorino (born 1979), Mexican footballer
Cesáreo Victorino (1947–1999), Mexican footballer
Cesàreo is also the stage name of Italian rock guitarist Davide Civaschi, a member of Elio e le Storie Tese.

Given names